Erik Olsson (14 January 1930 – 12 January 2016) was a Swedish wrestler. He competed in the men's Greco-Roman featherweight at the 1964 Summer Olympics.

References

External links
 

1930 births
2016 deaths
Swedish male sport wrestlers
Olympic wrestlers of Sweden
Wrestlers at the 1964 Summer Olympics
People from Kristianstad Municipality
Sportspeople from Skåne County
20th-century Swedish people